Kleindale is a census-designated place (CDP) in Pima County, Arizona, United States. It is bordered to the south, east, and west by the city of Tucson and to the north, across the Rillito River, by unincorporated Catalina Foothills. Kleindale was first listed as a CDP prior to the 2020 census.

Demographics

References 

Census-designated places in Pima County, Arizona